Hesketh End is an historic building in the English village of Chipping, Lancashire. Built in 1591, with later additions made in the early 17th century, it is now a Grade I listed building.

See also
Grade I listed buildings in Lancashire

References

1591 establishments in England
Country houses in Lancashire
Grade I listed buildings in Lancashire